The  Scottish Highland Massacre of Monzievaird  took place on 21 October 1490, at the church of Monzievaird, at Ochtertyre, near Hosh in Perthshire. Some sources give the date as 1511. It was the culmination of a violent blood feud between the Murray and Drummond families. Although feuding, murdering kin, and marrying enemies was commonplace for Highlanders at the time, the massacre was nevertheless notorious and sensational in its day.

Background
William Murray of Tullibardine lost the stewardship of Strathearn, which he had held for over fifty years, to Lord Drummond. Despite their marital links, the Drummonds evicted the Murrays and set about creating difficulties for George Murray, the abbot of Inchaffray Abbey. When the abbey subsequently ran short of funds Murray sought to assess the teinds of the Drummond lands of Monzievaird. The abbot charged the Murrays of Ochtertyre with the task, which they eagerly undertook with such brutality that the Drummonds were provoked into violent retaliation.

Massacre
Lord Drummond’s second son, David, accompanied by a body of retainers, set out to forcibly evict the Murrays from Ochtertyre, but the Murrays were warned of Drummond's attack and were well prepared. The turning point in the ensuing battle came when a party of McRobbies from Balloch and Faichneys from Argyllshire joined forces with the Drummonds against the Murrays. The Murrays were forced to the north and made a final stand at Hill at Knock Mary on the other side of Rottenreoch, from Monzievard kirk. Many Murrays were killed and the remainder fled back towards Ochtertyre.

As the Drummonds made their way back in triumph to Drummond Castle they came upon Duncan Campbell of Dunstaffnage with a party of his clan members. He also had a score to settle with the Murrays, as his father-in-law and two of his sons had been murdered by them some time before. Campbell persuaded the Drummonds to resume their pursuit of the Murrays, and the combined Drummonds and Campbells marched towards Ochtertyre.

About 20 Murray men fled and took refuge in the nearby church at Monzievaird, close by Hosh. One shot an arrow from the window of the church, killing one of the Drummonds searching for them outside but revealing their hiding place. The Drummonds retaliated by gathering all the brushwood they could find and stacking it against the church, which was roofed with thatch and heather, and lighting it. Only one of the Murray men survived the fire; the rest were killed either inside the church or trying to escape the building, reportedly to the accompaniment of a piper.

The one surviving Murray escaped death by jumping from a window. Thomas Drummond recognized him as his cousin and taking pity on him spirited him away. This act of compassion did not endear Thomas to the rest of his clan; he was forced to leave Crieff and lived in exile in Ireland for many years. Thomas eventually returned to Scotland after the Murrays had regained their power and showed their gratitude by giving him a small estate in Perthshire. This estate originally known as Drummond-Ernoch or Drummond of Ireland, now called Drummonderinoch, lies about a mile southeast of Comrie. The Faichneys, from Argyll, subsequently obtained land holdings around Strageath, Muthill and Innerpeffray.

Over the years oral history has placed the number of dead Murrays as high as 120 men along with wives and children, but others claim that this number is inflated.

Outcome
Blood feuds were threatening to create a breakdown of political and social life in parts of Scotland at the time and the authorities felt that an example had to be made. James IV of Scotland ordered the arrest of David Drummond and the other main antagonist, Duncan Campbell of Dunstaffnage. Both men were executed by hanging at Stirling.

1809
The old Monzievaird parish church was demolished, and nothing remains. On the site the Ochtertyre family built their Mausoleum in 1809; When the foundations of the present mausoleum were being dug a quantity of charred wood was found, and very many calcined bones

Site of the Church in modern times
Located near Hosh, by the side of the drive to Ochtertyre house from the A85, the house is about 1.1 km to the west. As of 2015 despite the roof being still intact, it is on the Buildings at Risk Register for Scotland.

Gallery

See also
 Scottish clan
 List of massacres in Great Britain

References

Further reading

External links
   
An alternative view of the massacre with links and pictures

History of Perth and Kinross
Massacres in Scotland
Monzievaird
1490 in Scotland
Conflicts in 1490
15th-century massacres